Richard Stuart Linklater (born July 30, 1960) is an American film director, producer, and screenwriter. He is known for films that revolve mainly around suburban culture and the effects of the passage of time. His films include the comedies Slacker (1990) and Dazed and Confused (1993); the Before trilogy of romance films, Before Sunrise (1995), Before Sunset (2004), and Before Midnight (2013); the music-themed comedy School of Rock (2003); the adult animated films Waking Life (2001), A Scanner Darkly (2006), and Apollo 10 1⁄2: A Space Age Childhood (2022); the coming-of-age drama Boyhood (2014); and the comedy film Everybody Wants Some!! (2016).

Linklater is known to have a distinct style and method of filmmaking. Many of his films are noted for their loosely structured narrative. The Before trilogy and Boyhood both feature the same actors filmed over an extended period of years. He has received several Academy Award nominations and won the Silver Bear for Best Director at the Berlin International Film Festival for his work on Before Sunrise. He also won a Golden Globe Award for directing Boyhood. In 2015, Linklater was included on the annual Time 100 list of the most influential people in the world.

Early life
Linklater was born in Houston, Texas, the son of Diane Margaret (née Krieger), who taught at Sam Houston State University, and Charles W. Linklater, III. He attended Huntsville High School in Huntsville, Texas, during grades 9–11, where he played football for Joe Clements as a backup quarterback for the #1 ranked team in the state. For his senior year, he moved to Bellaire High School in Bellaire, Texas because he was better at baseball than football and Bellaire had a better baseball coach. As a teen, Linklater won a Scholastic Art and Writing Award.

Linklater studied at Sam Houston State University (where he also played baseball), until dropping out to work on an offshore oil rig in the Gulf of Mexico. He frequently read novels on the rig, and upon returning to land, developed a love of film through repeated visits to a repertory cinema in Houston. At this point, Linklater realized he wanted to be a filmmaker. He used his savings to buy a Super-8 camera, a projector, and editing equipment, and moved to Austin, Texas.

Career

1985–2000: Early directing
Linklater founded the Austin Film Society in 1985 with his college professor Chale Nafus, University of Texas professor Charles Ramirez-Berg, SXSW founder Louis Black, and his frequent collaborator Lee Daniel. One of the mentors for the Film Society was former New York City critic for the SoHo Weekly News George Morris, who had relocated to Austin and taught film there.

For several years, Linklater made many short films that were exercises and experiments in film techniques. He finally completed his first feature, It's Impossible to Learn to Plow by Reading Books (which is available in The Criterion Collection edition of his second feature, Slacker), a Super-8 feature that took a year to shoot and another year to edit.

Linklater created Detour Filmproduction (an homage to the 1945 low budget film noir by Edgar G. Ulmer), and subsequently made Slacker for only $23,000. It went on to gross more than $1.25 million. The film shows an aimless day in the life of the city of Austin, Texas showcasing its more eccentric characters.

While gaining a cult following in the independent film world, he made his third film, Dazed and Confused, based on his years at Huntsville High School and the people he encountered there. The film garnered critical praise and grossed $8 million in the United States while becoming a hit on VHS. This film was also responsible for the breakout of fellow Texas native Matthew McConaughey.

In 1995, Linklater won the Silver Bear for Best Director for the film Before Sunrise at the 45th Berlin International Film Festival. His next feature, subUrbia, had mixed reviews critically, and did very poorly at the box office. In 1998, he took on his first Hollywood feature, The Newton Boys, which received mixed reviews while tanking at the box office.

2001–2013: Wider recognition
With the rotoscope films Waking Life and A Scanner Darkly, and his mainstream comedies, School of Rock and the remake of Bad News Bears, he gained wider recognition.

In 2003, he wrote and directed a pilot for HBO with Rodney Rothman called $5.15/hr, about several minimum wage restaurant workers. The pilot deals with themes later examined in Fast Food Nation.

The British television network Channel 4 produced a documentary about Linklater, in which the filmmaker discussed the personal and philosophical ideas behind his films. St Richard of Austin was presented by Ben Lewis and directed by Irshad Ashraf and broadcast on Channel 4 in December 2004 in the UK.

Linklater was nominated for an Academy Award for Best Adapted Screenplay for his film Before Sunset.

Waking Life and A Scanner Darkly both used rotoscoping animation techniques. Working with Bob Sabiston and Sabiston's program Rotoshop to create this effect, Linklater shot and edited both movies completely as live-action features, then employed a team of artists to "trace over" individual frames. The result is a distinctive "semi-real" quality, praised by such critics as Roger Ebert (in the case of Waking Life) as being original and well-suited to the aims of the film.

Fast Food Nation (2006) is an adaptation of the best selling book that examines the local and global influence of the United States fast food industry. The film was entered into the 2006 Cannes Film Festival before being released in North America on November 17, 2006 and in Europe on March 23, 2007. The film received mixed reviews.

Linklater fared better with the critics with A Scanner Darkly (released in the same year), Me and Orson Welles (2009), and Bernie (2011).

He was nominated for an Academy Award for Best Adapted Screenplay for Before Midnight, the third film in the Before... trilogy.

2014–present: Boyhood and other works
In 2014 he released the film Boyhood, which had been 12 years in the making. Boyhood received overwhelming critical acclaim. Linklater won the Golden Globes, Critics' Choice Movie Awards, and BAFTAs for Best Director and Best Picture. He also received his first nomination for the Academy Award for Best Director, along with nominations for Best Original Screenplay and Best Picture.

For a while Linklater was attached to direct a remake of The Incredible Mr. Limpet for Warner Bros. However, he dropped the project in favor of working on a spiritual successor to Dazed and Confused, titled Everybody Wants Some!!, with backing from Annapurna Pictures and Paramount distributing the film in North America. The film was released in March 2016 and was well received by critics, but it failed to recoup its budget of 10 million dollars, grossing only 4.6 million.

In the second half of the 2010s, Linklater wrote and directed the drama film Last Flag Flying, starring Bryan Cranston, Laurence Fishburne, and Steve Carell. A sequel to Hal Ashby's 1973 film The Last Detail, it began filming in November 2016, and was released on November 3, 2017. Linklater then directed Where'd You Go, Bernadette, based on the novel by Maria Semple and produced by Annapurna Pictures.

Linklater was attached to direct an adaptation of Graeme Simsion's novel The Rosie Project that would have starred Jennifer Lawrence in the lead role, but he dropped out of directing when Lawrence dropped out of the project.

In 2019, it was announced that Linklater would be filming an adaptation of Stephen Sondheim's musical Merrily We Roll Along. Like Boyhood, it will be filmed over the course of several years, but, like the musical and the play it is based on, will be presented in reverse chronology.

Directorial style
Inspiration for Linklater's work was largely based on his experience viewing the film Raging Bull.

It made me see movies as a potential outlet for what I was thinking about and hoping to express. At that point I was an unformed artist. At that moment, something was simmering in me, but Raging Bull brought it to a boil.

He was also influenced by Robert Bresson, Yasujirō Ozu, Rainer Werner Fassbinder, Eric Rohmer, François Truffaut, Josef Von Sternberg, and Carl Theodor Dreyer.

Many of Linklater's films, including Slacker, Dazed and Confused, Tape, and all three installments of the Before Trilogy, take place in a single day. They are less plot driven and more about human interactions.

Ethan Hawke and Matthew McConaughey have appeared in many of his films. Other actors who have appeared in more than one film include Jack Black, Julie Delpy, Ellar Coltrane, Adam Goldberg, Parker Posey, Glen Powell, Rory Cochrane, Greg Kinnear, Patricia Arquette, and Laurence Fishburne.

Personal life
Linklater lives in Austin, Texas and refuses to live or work in Hollywood for any extended period of time.

Linklater has been partnered with Christina Harrison since the 1990s. In 1994 they had a daughter, and twin girls in 2004. The oldest, Lorelei Linklater, co-starred in Boyhood as the sister of the main character.

Linklater has been a vegetarian since his early 20s. In 2015, he explained the dietary lifestyle in a Boyhood-style documentary for People for the Ethical Treatment of Animals.

Filmography

Feature films

Acting roles

Short films

Television

Other works

Reception

Critical reception

Box office

Awards and nominations

Slacker (1991) was nominated for Best Director at the Independent Spirit Awards.
Before Sunrise (1995) won the Silver Bear for Best Director at the Berlin International Film Festival.
Waking Life (2001) was nominated for Best Director and Best Screenplay at the Independent Spirit Awards.
Before Sunset (2004) was nominated for Best Adapted Screenplay by the Academy of Motion Picture Arts and Sciences and Best Screenplay at the Independent Spirit Awards.
A Scanner Darkly (2006) – Named Best Austin Film by the Austin Film Critics Association.
Me and Orson Welles (2008) – Named Best Austin Film by the Austin Film Critics Association.
Bernie (2011) – Named Best Austin Film by the Austin Film Critics Association.
Before Midnight (2013) was nominated for Best Adapted Screenplay by the Academy of Motion Picture Arts and Sciences and Best Screenplay at the Independent Spirit Awards.
Boyhood (2014) was nominated for Best Picture, Best Director, Best Original Screenplay, Best Film Editing, Best Supporting Actor, and Best Supporting Actress by the Academy of Motion Picture Arts and Sciences and won Best Supporting Actress for Patricia Arquette. It also won Golden Globes for Best Director and Best Motion Picture – Drama, as well as the Silver Bear for Best Director at the 64th Berlin International Film Festival. Received Best Film and Best Director honors from Los Angeles Film Critics Association, Boston Society of Film Critics, New York Film Critics Circle, Washington D.C. Area Film Critics Association and New York Film Critics Online.
Linklater was made Honorary Associate of London Film School.

References

External links

1960 births
American male screenwriters
Film directors from Texas
Living people
Artists from Austin, Texas
Bellaire High School (Bellaire, Texas) alumni
Best Director BAFTA Award winners
Best Director Golden Globe winners
Culture of Austin, Texas 
Film producers from Texas
Filmmakers who won the Best Film BAFTA Award
Golden Globe Award-winning producers
Independent Spirit Award for Best Director winners
People from Huntsville, Texas
Sam Houston State University alumni
Sam Houston Bearkats baseball players
Screenwriters from Texas
Silver Bear for Best Director recipients
Writers from Austin, Texas
Writers from Houston
Postmodernist filmmakers